In June 2008 an independent non-profit organization, Information Card Foundation (ICF), was created. The ICF consists of Steering Community board members and Steering Business board members. Some of the businesses include Equifax, Google, Microsoft, Novell, Oracle Corporation and PayPal. The foundation was formed to promote Information Card technology, a user-centric, cross-platform, identity technology that shifts control over personal information to the individual. Information cards allow the user to control release of self-asserted claims or claims made by a third-party identity provider (called a "card issuer") represented using a card/wallet metaphor in a user interface (web or smart client) called a "card selector", to relying parties (i.e. apps and websites)

Notes

References 
 Technology Leaders Favor Online ID Card Over Passwords - New York Times article 24-Jun-08 announcing the Information Card Foundation
 Press Release - Announcement of the Information Card Foundation
 Heavy Hitters Collaborate on Promoting Digital-ID Tech - ComputerWorld Article covering ICF announcement.

External links 
 Information Card Foundation Website
 Information Card Ecosystem White Paper

Identity management
Federated identity
Computer security organizations